Elysius hermia is a moth of the family Erebidae first described by Pieter Cramer in 1777. It is found in French Guiana, Suriname, Guyana, Brazil, Venezuela and Colombia.

References

Moths described in 1777
hermia
Moths of South America